Arne Sørensen (2 October 1906 – 1 March 1978) was a Danish politician and author. He founded the Danish Unity party and was a resistance fighter during the occupation of Denmark. After World War II, Sørensen was a member of the Danish Parliament and Minister of Ecclesiastical Affairs.

Career
Arne Sørensen was a member of the Social Democratic Party until 1936. He felt that the Cabinet of Stuning-Munch, which led the party, was parliamentary ineffective and was too sympathetic towards the Government of Nazi Germany. In response, Sørensen left the party and created the anti-parliamentary Danish Unity party, of which he was chairman until 1946.

During the German occupation of Denmark, Sørensen was an active resistance fighter in the Holger Danske group and in 1943 he became a key member of the Danish Freedom Council. After the war, he was appointed the Minister of Ecclesiastical Affairs and was an advisor to the US military government in Germany in 1948.

In 1949, he largely left his political career behind and instead focused on his writing. Sørensen maintained liberal views on social policy and was a supporter of public pensions (Folkepension) and compulsory child support. In the late 1960s, he was a supporter of the European Federation and advocated for the creation of the United States of Europe. He authored an article in 1973 which argued for an expansion of immigration in Denmark in order to fuel the country's economy.

Sørensen taught lectures in the United States in the later part of his life and frequently traveled between the two countries. He traveled broadly in Europe and the Americas until 1965, when he permanently moved back to Denmark.

Personal life 
Sørensen was born in Hvalpsund to Karen Marie Nielsen and Christian Sørensen, a housekeeper. In 1931, he married Nina Sørensen, the daughter of Julius Rasmussen and Ingeborg Lumholdt.

He died on March 1, 1978, and is buried at Hellerup Cemetery.

Bibliography 

 Spark og Kærtegn (1930)
 Funktionalisme og Samfund (1933)
 Det moderne Menneske (1936)
 Frihed, Sandhed og Ret (1942)
 Niels Jydes Breve (1946)
 Mellem Øst og Vest (1950)
 Fra Hollywood til Akropolis (1952)
 Sønner af de slagne (1965)
 Hvem styrer staten? (1970)

References

External links

Danish resistance members
Danish male writers
1978 deaths
1906 births
Danish Unity politicians
Danish Ministers for Ecclesiastical Affairs
Burials at Hellerup Cemetery